Nicola De Giosa (3 May 1819 – 7 July 1885) was an Italian composer and conductor active in Naples. He composed numerous operas, the most successful of which, Don Checco and Napoli di carnevale, were in the  Neapolitan opera buffa genre. His other works included sacred music and art songs. His songs were particularly popular, bringing him fame as a salon composer both in Italy and abroad. De Giosa died in Bari, the city of his birth, at the age of 66.

Life and career
De Giosa was born in Bari to Angelantonio and Lucia (née Favia) De Giosa. He initially trained to be a flautist, first in Bari with his elder brother Giuseppe and then with Errico Daniele. Daniele recognized his talent and persuaded De Giosa's father to enroll him at the Conservatory of San Pietro a Majella in Naples. He passed the entrance examination at age 14 with sufficient merit to be awarded free tuition at the conservatory and continued his flute studies there with Pasquale Bongiorno. He also studied composition with Francesco Ruggi, Niccolò Zingarelli, and later with Gaetano Donizetti. According to contemporary accounts, he was one of Donizetti's favourite pupils. In 1839, while still a student, two of his compositions for soloists, chorus and orchestra were performed at the conservatory in honour of Count Wenzel Robert von Gallenberg who had died in March of that year. However, in 1841 he left San Pietro a Majella without completing his studies following a series of disputes with the Saverio Mercadante who succeeded Zingarelli as the conservatory's director in 1840.

In 1842 De Giosa made his debut as an opera composer with the premiere of his opera buffa, La casa di tre artisti, at the Teatro Nuovo. It was well received in Naples and replicated in Turin, Genoa and Milan in 1846 under the title L'arrivo del signor zio. While it was a success with the audiences of Genoa and Turin, the Milan reception suffered from a poor production and arguments between supporters of the old Neapolitan school exemplified by De Giosa and those of the new style exemplified by Verdi whose Due Foscari was also playing in city. He produced 14 more operas between 1845 and 1882, most of which were in the opera buffa and opera semiseria genres and premiered in Naples. He also composed in the opera seria  genre, but they were not nearly as successful and considered "pale imitations" of Donizetti. De Giosa's masterpiece and one of the last great successes in the history of Neapolitan opera buffa was Don Checco. It had a run of 98 consecutive performances at the Teatro Nuovo where it premiered in 1850 and was regularly produced in numerous opera houses in Italy and abroad over the next 40 years. It was produced in Naples as late as 1902 and was revived in 2014 in a co-production by the Teatro San Carlo and the Festival della Valle d'Itria.

In middle age, De Giosa began an active conducting career. According to musicologist Andrea Lanza, as a conductor he was "particularly admired for the scrupulousness of his orchestral balance and ensemble." He was Chief Conductor at the Teatro San Carlo in Naples for several seasons between 1860 and 1876, conducting amongst other performances, the premiere of Mercadante's Virginia in 1866 and the posthumous premiere of Donizetti's Gabriella di Vergy in 1869. His other conducting posts included the 1867–68 season at La Fenice in Venice, the 1870–71 season at the Khedivial Opera House in Cairo, and the 1873 season at the Teatro Colón in Buenos Aires. De Giosa's biographer, Alfredo Giovine, wrote that during this period he suffered two painful setbacks. He lost most of his savings when several Neapolitan banks failed, and later many of his manuscript scores disappeared while he was on one of his absences from Naples. He returned home to find that his maid had sold the scores for a pittance to the proprietor of a local delicatessen who used them for wrapping food. According to Giovine, De Giosa eventually  replaced his lost savings with the money he earned from his successful conducting career.

Despite his concentration on conducting after 1860, De Giosa continued to compose operas, although several of them were revisions of earlier works. The most successful of these later works was Napoli di carnovale. The project was a protest against the "invasion" of Neapolitan opera stages by French operetta at the expense of the city's native musical culture. Set in a working-class neighbourhood of Naples at Carnival time, it recounts the ultimately successful campaign by Temostocle, nephew of the wealthy and pretentious Don Gasperone, to marry the daughter of a shoemaker. Napoli di carnovale premiered to great success at the Teatro Nuovo in 1876. It ran for 85 performances there and was subsequently performed in multiple Italian and foreign theatres over the next ten years. During this time De Giosa was also active as a teacher at the Conservatory of San Pietro a Majella and in organizations dedicated to the encouragement of young musicians and composers.

De Giosa spent his last years in Bari under the care of his doctors and relatives. By June 1884 he was reported to be suffering from insanity and severe physical debilitation. He no longer recognized the friends who came to visit him and frequently invoked his old teacher, murmuring "Donizetti!... student of Donizetti... I die looking up to the sky!". He died in July 1885 at the age of 66 and was buried in the city's Cimitero Chiesa Madre. The street Via Nicola de Giosa which ends at the Teatro Petruzzelli was named in his honour. He is also commemorated with a large statue which stands in the foyer of the Petruzzelli. It had survived the fire which virtually destroyed the original building in 1991.

Works

Operas
La casa di tre artisti (opera buffa in 3 acts); libretto by Andrea Passaro; premiered Teatro Nuovo, Naples, 1842
Elvina (opera semiseria in 3 acts); libretto by Almerindo Spadetta; premiered Teatro Nuovo, Naples, 1845
Ascanio il gioielliere (opera semiseria in 3 acts); libretto by Giuseppe Sesto Giannini; premiered Teatro d'Angennes, Turin, 1847
Le due guide (melodramma in 4 acts); libretto by Marco D'Arienzo, premiered Teatro degli Armeni, Livorno, 1848
 Don Checco (opera buffa in 2 acts); libretto by Almerindo Spadetta; premiered Teatro Nuovo, Naples, 1850
Folco d'Arles (melodramma tragico in 3 acts); libretto by Salvadore Cammarano after Victor Hugo;  premiered Teatro San Carlo, Naples, 1851
Guido Colmar (opera seria in 3 acts); libretto by Domenico Bolognese; premiered Teatro San Carlo, Naples, 1852
Ettore Fieramosca (opera seria in 3 acts); libretto by Domenico Bolognese; premiered Teatro San Carlo, Naples, 1855
Un geloso e la sua vedova (commedia lirica in 3 acts); libretto by  Ernesto Del Preite, premiered Teatro Nuovo, Naples, 1857
Isella la modista (dramma giocoso in 3 acts); libretto by Leopoldo Tarantini; premiered Teatro del Fondo, Naples, 1857
 Il bosco di Dafne (dramma cristiano in 3 acts); libretto by Michele Achille Bianchi; premiered Teatro San Carlo, Naples, 1864
Il pipistrello (operetta comica in 3 acts); libretto by Enrico Golisciani after Desforges; premiered Teatro della Società Filarmonica, Naples, 1875
Napoli di carnovale (opera buffa in 3 acts); libretto Marco D'Arienzo and Enrico Golisciani; premiered Teatro Nuovo, Naples, 1876
Il conte di San Romano (dramma lirico in 4 acts); libretto by Enrico Golisciani; premiered Teatro Bellini, Naples, 1878
Rabagas (opera comica in 4 acts); libretto by Enrico Golisciani after Victorien Sardou; premiered Teatro Argentina, Rome, 1882

Sacred music
Most of De Giosa's sacred music was composed during his time at the San Pietro a Majella conservatory including four masses, three of them messe di gloria, and a Dixit Dominus. He also composed a Stabat Mater, Salve Regina, and  three sinfonie based on themes from his masses and the Dixit. In the early 1870s he composed a requiem mass in memory of Donizetti. The Donizetti requiem received its first 20th-century performance in 1997 at the Festival della Valle d'Itria.

Other vocal
De Giosa composed over 400 art songs and pieces of salon music. Many of these pieces were published in 26 collections of his work—10 in Milan and 16 in Naples. He also wrote several longer pieces of vocal music for specific occasions:
Una lagrima sulla tomba del Conte Gallenberg (A Tear on the Tomb of Count Gallenberg), prayer for soloist, chorus, and orchestra (1839)
 Inno funebre, funeral hymn (also for Count Gallenberg) for four soloists, chorus and orchestra (1839)
Cantata for the dedication of the marble bust of Ferdinand II in the Acquaviva delle Fonti Cathedral (1853)
Cantata celebrating the wedding of Francis, Duke of Calabria and Princess Maria Sofia of Bavaria in Bari (1859)
Cantata in honour of the patron saint of Acquaviva delle Fonti (1864)

Notes

References

External links
Scores by De Giosa at the International Music Score Library Project
"A Donizettian Life: Nicola De Giosa" and "Il Vedovo Solitario", papers on De Giosa's life and his relationship with Donizetti by Donizetti scholar Alexander Weatherson 

1819 births
1885 deaths
19th-century classical composers
Italian classical composers
Italian opera composers
Male opera composers
People from Bari
19th-century Italian composers
19th-century Italian male musicians